Jean-Louis Petit (13 March 1674 – 20 April 1750) was a French surgeon and the inventor of a screw-type tourniquet. He was first enthusiastic about anatomy and received a master's certificate in surgery in Paris in 1700. He became a member of the French Royal Academy of Sciences in 1715 and was named director of the French Royal Academy of Surgery by the king when it was created in 1731. He acquired great notoriety because of his skill and experience, thanks to his case reports of hemorrhage, lacrimal fistula and operation on the frenum, for his treatise on bone diseases and especially for his general treatise on surgical operations, on which he worked for 12 years and which was finished after his death by François-Dominique Lesné (1722—1800).

References

1674 births
1750 deaths
French anatomists
French surgeons
Members of the French Academy of Sciences
Fellows of the Royal Society